|}

This is a list of results for the Legislative Council at the 2018 South Australian state election.

The 11 of 22 seats up for election were 4 Liberal, 4 Labor, 1 Green, 1 Conservative and 1 Dignity. The final outcome was 4 Liberal, 4 Labor, 2 SA Best and 1 Green. Carrying over from the 2014 election were 4 Liberal, 4 Labor, 1 Green, 1 Advance SA, and 1 Conservative; although the Conservative, Dennis Hood, defected to the Liberals nine days after the 2018 state election.

So from 2018 to 2020, the 22 seat upper house composition was 9 Liberal on the government benches, 8 Labor on the opposition benches, and 5 to minor parties on the crossbench, consisting of 2 SA Best, 2 Greens, and 1 Advance SA. The government therefore required at least three additional non-government members to form a majority and carry votes on the floor.

In 2020, John Dawkins was expelled from the Liberal Party for breaking party rules by nominating himself for President of the Legislative Council. The 22 seat upper house composition before the 2022 election was therefore 8 Liberal, 8 Labor, 2 SA Best, 2 Greens, 1 Advance SA, and 1 independent.

Election results

See also
 Candidates of the 2018 South Australian state election
 Members of the South Australian Legislative Council, 2018–2022

References

2018
2018 elections in Australia
2010s in South Australia